"I Will Remember" is a 1995 song performed by Toto from their album Tambu. The song reached number 64 on the UK Singles Chart.

Personnel
Steve Lukather – guitars, lead and backing vocals, piano and synthesizer
David Paich – piano, backing vocals, string conductor & arrangements
Mike Porcaro – bass guitar
Simon Phillips – drums

Additional personnel
John Jessel – keyboard programming
Shari Sutcliffe – strings contractor
Lenny Castro – percussion

Charts

References

Toto (band) songs
1995 singles
Songs written by Steve Lukather
Columbia Records singles
Songs written by Stan Lynch
1995 songs